Graphics32 is a free graphics library for Borland Delphi and Kylix optimized for 32-bit pixel formats which is licensed under the Mozilla Public License.

Graphics32 provides fast operations for pixels and graphic primitives and is almost a hundred times faster in per-pixel and about 2–5 times faster in drawing lines access than the standard components by Embarcadero which are wrappers for the Windows GDI. Additionally, it provides alpha blending, anti-aliasing as well as filters for resampling and deforming bitmaps.

Features
Some of Graphics32 features include:

Fast per-pixel access up to 100 times faster compared to standard TBitmap 
High-performance Bitmap alpha blending (including per-pixel alpha blending) 
Pixel, line and polygon antialiasing with sub-pixel accuracy (combined with alpha blending)
Bitmap resampling with high quality reconstruction filters (e.g. Lanczos, Cubic, Mitchell)
Flexible supersampling implementation for maximum sampling quality
Flicker-free image displaying components with optimized double buffering via advanced MicroTiles based repaint optimizer

Link

Additional information

Graphics libraries
Pascal (programming language) software